Bailey Memorial Stadium is a 6,500-seat multi-purpose stadium in Clinton, South Carolina. It is home to the Presbyterian College Blue Hose football team. The facility opened in 2002. The playing surface is named Claude Crocker Field. The facility features a multi-level press box, a spacious field house and concession stands for home and visiting fans.

See also
 List of NCAA Division I FCS football stadiums

References

External links
Facility information

College football venues
Sports venues in South Carolina
Multi-purpose stadiums in the United States
Sports venues in Laurens County, South Carolina
Presbyterian College
2002 establishments in South Carolina
Sports venues completed in 2002